Erbessa euryzona is a moth of the family Notodontidae first described by Francis Walker in 1854. It is found in Brazil, Colombia, Venezuela, Ecuador and Peru.

References

Moths described in 1922
Notodontidae of South America